Bobsleigh Canada Skeleton (BCS) is the official federation for bobsleigh and skeleton in Canada. It serves as the Canadian representative for the International Bobsleigh and Skeleton Federation and is part of the Canadian Olympic Committee.

BCS is headquartered in Calgary, Alberta at Canada Olympic Park.

References
Official website 

Bobsleigh in Canada
Skeleton in Canada
Sports governing bodies in Canada
Organizations based in Calgary
Canada at the Winter Olympics
1986 establishments in Alberta
Sports organizations established in 1986